The 2021 ATP Finals (also known as the 2021 Nitto ATP Finals for sponsorship reasons) was a men's tennis tournament played on indoor hard courts at the Pala Alpitour in Turin, Italy, from 14 to 21 November 2021. It was the season-ending event for the highest-ranked singles players and doubles teams on the 2021 ATP Tour.

This was the 52nd edition of the tournament (47th in doubles), and the first time Turin hosted the ATP Tour year-end championships.

Champions

Singles

 Alexander Zverev def.  Daniil Medvedev, 6–4, 6–4

Doubles

 Pierre-Hugues Herbert /  Nicolas Mahut def.  Rajeev Ram /  Joe Salisbury, 6–4, 7–6(7–0)

Day-by-day summaries

Points and prize money
The ATP Finals currently (2021) rewards the following points and prize money, per victory:

 1 Prize money for doubles is per team.
 An undefeated champion would earn the maximum 1,500 points, and $2,316,000 in singles or $429,000 in doubles.

Tournament

Format
The ATP Finals group stage had a round-robin format, with eight players/teams divided into two groups of four and each player/team in a group playing the other three in the group. The eight seeds were determined by the ATP rankings and ATP Doubles Team Rankings on the Monday after the last ATP Tour tournament of the calendar year. All singles matches, including the final, were best of three sets with tie-breaks in each set including the third. All doubles matches were two sets (no ad) and a Match Tie-break.

In deciding placement within a group, the following criteria were used, in order:

 Most wins.
 Most matches played (e.g., a 2–1 record beats a 2–0 record).
 Head-to-head result between tied players/teams.
 Highest percentage of sets won.
 Highest percentage of games won.
 ATP rank after the last ATP Tour tournament of the year.

Criteria 4–6 were used only in the event of a three-way tie; if one of these criteria decided a winner or loser among the three, the remaining two would have been ranked by head-to-head result.

The top two of each group advanced to semifinals, with the winner of each group playing the runner-up of the other group. The winners of the semifinals then played for the title.

Qualification

Singles
Eight players compete at the tournament, with two named alternates. Players receive places in the following order of precedence:
 First, the top 7 players in the ATP Race to Turin on the Monday after the final tournament of the ATP Tour, that is, after the Stockholm Open.
 Second, up to two 2021 Grand Slam tournament winners ranked anywhere 8th–20th, in ranking order
 Third, the eighth ranked player in the ATP rankings
In the event of this totaling more than 8 players, those lower down in the selection order become the alternates. If further alternates are needed, these players are selected by the ATP.

Provisional rankings are published weekly as the ATP Race to Turin, which only counts events played in 2021. Points are accumulated in Grand Slam, ATP Tour, ATP Cup, ATP Challenger Tour and ITF Tour tournaments. Players accrue points across 19 tournaments, usually made up of:

 The 4 Grand Slam tournaments
 The 8 mandatory ATP Masters 1000 tournaments
 The best results from any 7 other tournaments that carry ranking points (ATP Cup, ATP 500, ATP 250, Challenger, ITF)

All players must include the ranking points for mandatory Masters tournaments for which they are on the original acceptance list and for all Grand Slams for which they would be eligible, even if they do not compete (in which case they receive zero points). Furthermore, players who finished 2020 in the world's top 30 are commitment players who must (if not injured) include points for the 8 mandatory Masters tournament regardless of whether they enter, and who must compete in at least 4 ATP 500 tournaments (though the Monte Carlo Masters may count to this total), of which one must take place after the US Open.  Zero point scores may also be taken from withdrawals by non-injured players from ATP 500 tournaments according to certain other conditions outlined by the ATP. Beyond these rules, however, a player may substitute his next best tournament result for missed Masters and Grand Slam tournaments.

Players may have their ATP Tour Masters 1000 commitment reduced by one tournament, by reaching each of the following milestones:
 600 tour level matches (as of January 1, 2021),
 12 years of service,
 31 years of age (as of January 1, 2021).
If a player satisfies all three of these conditions, their mandatory ATP Tour Masters 1000 commitment is dropped entirely. Players must be in good standing as defined by the ATP as to avail of the reduced commitment.

Doubles
Eight teams compete at the tournament, with one named alternates. The eight competing teams receive places according to the same order of precedence as in singles. The named alternate will be offered first to any unaccepted teams in the selection order, then to the highest ranked unaccepted team, and then to a team selected by the ATP. Points are accumulated in the same competitions as for the singles tournament. However, for Doubles teams there are no commitment tournaments, so teams are ranked according to their 19 highest points scoring results from any tournaments on the ATP Tour.

Qualified players

Singles

Doubles

Groupings

Singles

The singles draw of the 2021 edition of the Year–end Championships will feature one number one, two major champions and three major finalists. The competitors were divided into two groups.

Doubles
The doubles draw of the 2021 edition of the Year–end Championships will feature four number-ones, six major champions and one major finalist team. The pairs were divided into two groups.

Points breakdown

Singles

Doubles

Head-to-head records
Below are the head-to-head records as they approached the tournament.

Singles
Overall

Doubles

See also
ATP rankings
2021 WTA Finals
2021 Next Generation ATP Finals
ATP Finals appearances

References

External links
  
 ATP tournament profile

 
Finals
2021
2021 ATP Finals
2021 in Italian tennis
Sports competitions in Turin
November 2021 sports events in Italy